Paulo Thiago Alencar Antunes (born January 25, 1981) is a Brazilian mixed martial artist who most recently competed in the Middleweight division of KSW. A professional competitor since 2005, he has also competed for the UFC and Jungle Fight. Thiago is also a member of Polícia Militar do Distrito Federal and works for BOPE, a special forces unit in his hometown of Brasília, Brazil.

Background
Thiago is from Brasília, Distrito Federal, and began training in judo when he was five years old.

Mixed martial arts

Early career
Thiago made his professional debut at Storm Samurai 8 in 2005. He fought Ricardo Petrucio and won the fight via submission in round three. His next three fights came on the same night almost a year after his debut. Thiago competed in the Grand Prix Planaltina, winning all three of his fights and became the tournament winner. Thiago finished all three of the fights by submission. After two more victories, Thiago was signed by Jungle Fights MMA. Thiago won four fights for the promotion before being signed by the Ultimate Fighting Championships.

He currently trains with the Constrictor Team, an affiliate of Team Black House; the famed gym of Anderson Silva and the Nogueira brothers.

Ultimate Fighting Championship
Thiago never signed a contract before his fight against Koscheck, he was only able to acquire a tryout. Thiago made his UFC debut on February 21, 2009, scoring an upset victory over top contender Josh Koscheck at UFC 95. During the fight, commentator Joe Rogan commented that Thiago's striking looked inferior to Koscheck's. However, Thiago won the fight by KO, with a flush right uppercut and a left hook. The referee stopped the fight before Thiago could pounce on him. Koscheck immediately rose and argued that he was still alert and able to defend himself. Further review of the replay shows Koscheck's eyes roll back as he falls down, giving merit to the stoppage. At the post-fight conference, Dana White confirmed that Thiago had earned Knockout of the Night honors.

Thiago had his second fight in the UFC, fighting against former title challenger and Koscheck teammate Jon Fitch at UFC 100. This was Thiago's first fight in the United States and he lost via unanimous decision. 

Thiago rebounded with a unanimous decision victory over UFC newcomer Jacob Volkmann at UFC 106. 

In Thiago's fourth outing in the UFC octagon, he was set to have a rematch against Josh Koscheck at UFC 109. However, Koscheck pulled out of the bout after an undisclosed injury and was replaced by AKA teammate Mike Swick. Thiago won via submission (D'arce Choke) in the second round and earned his second UFC fight bonus with the win.

Thiago faced Martin Kampmann on June 12, 2010, at UFC 115 where he lost via unanimous decision (30-27, 30-27, 30-27).

Thiago lost his second straight fight via unanimous decision to Diego Sanchez on October 23, 2010, at UFC 121. Though Thiago started the fight off strong by winning the first round, he began to tire and eventually succumbed to the cardio and wrestling skills of Sanchez in the second and third rounds. The bout earned Fight of the Night, awarding both fighters an extra paycheck.

In November 2010, Thiago signed a new four-fight deal with the UFC. Thiago was expected to face Johny Hendricks on March 3, 2011, at UFC Live: Sanchez vs. Kampmann.  However, Thiago was forced out of the bout with an elbow injury.

Thiago defeated David Mitchell via unanimous decision on August 27, 2011, at UFC 134, completely dominating Mitchell throughout all three rounds.

Thiago was expected to face Mike Pyle on January 14, 2012, at UFC 142.  However, Thiago was forced out of the bout with an elbow injury and replaced by Ricardo Funch.

Thiago faced Siyar Bahadurzada on April 14, 2012, at UFC on Fuel TV: Gustafsson vs. Silva. He was knocked out less than a minute into the first round after Siyar landed a right hook to the jaw that followed a left jab as Thiago was moving forward. This marked the first time Thiago had been finished in his career.

Thiago next faced Dong Hyun Kim on November 10, 2012, at UFC on Fuel TV 6. He lost the bout via unanimous decision

Thiago was expected to face Lance Benoist on May 18, 2013, at UFC on FX 8. However, on April 20, it was announced that Benoist had to pull out of the bout due to an injury.  He was replaced by UFC newcomer Michel Prazeres. Thiago won the fight via unanimous decision.

Thiago was expected to face Kelvin Gastelum on August 28, 2013, at UFC Fight Night 27.  However, Thiago pulled out of the bout citing a knee injury.

Thiago faced Brandon Thatch at UFC Fight Night 32 on November 9, 2013. He tapped to strikes in the first round after absorbing a knee to the liver.

Thiago faced Gasan Umalatov on May 31, 2014, at The Ultimate Fighter Brazil 3 Finale. He lost the fight via unanimous decision.

Despite being 2–6 in his last eight fights inside the octagon, Thiago signed a new four-fight contract with the UFC in June 2014. He was expected to face Mike Rhodes at UFC Fight Night 51 on September 13, 2014. However, Rhodes was forced out of the bout due to injury and was briefly replaced by returning veteran Joe Riggs.  Subsequently, Riggs was forced to pull out of the fight after accidentally shooting himself in the leg while cleaning a pistol at his home.  Thiago instead faced Sean Spencer. Thiago lost the fight via unanimous decision and was subsequently released by the UFC.

Post-UFC career
After the release, Thiago was scheduled to face Joe Ray at Rebel FC 3 on June 26, 2015. However, Thiago withdrew from the bout due to an injury.

Then he was scheduled to face Abubakar Vagaev at Akhmat Fight Show 18 on April 9, 2016. Thiago was again forced to withdraw from the bout.

Thiago faced Markus Perez for the vacant Thunder Fight Middleweight Championship at Thunder Fight 7 on June 25, 2016. He lost the fight via split decision.

Thiago then faced Paulistenio Rocha for the interim TWC Welterweight Championship at The Warriors Combat 3 on August 13, 2016. He won the fight via unanimous decision and claimed the championship.

Thiago then faced Cheick Kone at Fight2Night 1 on November 4, 2016. He won the fight via third-round submission.

In the sophomore event of the promotion, Thiago faced Faycal Hucin at Fight2Night 2 on April 28, 2017. He won the fight via first-round submission.

Thiago faced Michał Materla at KSW 40: Dublin on October 22, 2017. He lost the fight via second-round knockout.

Thiago faced Ailton Barbosa at Global Legion FC 13 on December 13, 2019. He won the fight via unanimous decision.

Six days removed from his previous bout, Thiago faced Sam Liera at SMASH Global 9 on December 19, 2019. He lost the fight via first-round knockout.

Personal life
Thiago is married and has twins.

Championships and accomplishments
Ultimate Fighting Championship
Knockout of the Night (One time) vs. Josh Koscheck 
Submission of the Night (One time) vs. Mike Swick 
Fight of the Night (One time) vs. Diego Sanchez

Mixed martial arts record

|-
| Loss
| align=center| 19–11
| Sam Liera
| TKO (punches)
| SMASH Global 9
| 
| align=center|1
| align=center|4:58
| Hollywood, California, United States
| 
|-
| Win
| align=center| 19–10
| Alton Barbosa
| Decision (unanimous)
| Global Legion FC 13
| 
| align=center|3
| align=center|5:00
| Miramar, Florida, United States
|Catchweight (175 lbs) bout.
|-
| Loss
| align=center| 18–10
| Michał Materla
| TKO (punches)
| KSW 40: Dublin
| 
| align=center|2
| align=center|0:50
| Dublin, Ireland
| 
|-
| Win
| align=center| 18–9
| Faycal Hucin
| Submission (armbar)
| Fight2Night 2
| 
| align=center| 1
| align=center| 3:11
| Foz do Iguaçu, Paraná, Brazil
|
|-
| Win
| align=center| 17–9
| Cheick Kone
| Submission (rear-naked choke)
| Fight2Night 1
| 
| align=center| 3
| align=center| 4:16
| Rio de Janeiro, Rio de Janeiro, Brazil
|
|-
| Win
| align=center| 16–9
| Paulistenio Rocha
| Decision (unanimous)
| The Warriors Combat 3
| 
| align=center| 3
| align=center| 5:00
| Brasília, Distrito Federal, Brazil
|
|-
| Loss
| align=center| 15–9
| Markus Perez Echeimberg
| Decision (split)
| Thunder Fight 7
| 
| align=center| 5
| align=center| 5:00
| São Paulo, São Paulo, Brazil
| 
|-
| Loss
| align=center| 15–8
| Sean Spencer
| Decision (unanimous)
| UFC Fight Night: Bigfoot vs. Arlovski
| 
| align=center| 3
| align=center| 5:00
| Brasília, Distrito Federal, Brazil
| 
|-
| Loss
| align=center| 15–7
| Gasan Umalatov
| Decision (unanimous)
| The Ultimate Fighter Brazil 3 Finale: Miocic vs. Maldonado
| 
| align=center| 3 
| align=center| 5:00
| São Paulo, São Paulo, Brazil
| 
|-
| Loss
| align=center| 15–6
| Brandon Thatch
| TKO (submission to knee to the body)
| UFC Fight Night: Belfort vs. Henderson 2
| 
| align=center| 1
| align=center| 2:10
| Goiânia, Goiás, Brazil
| 
|-
| Win
| align=center| 15–5
| Michel Prazeres
| Decision (unanimous)
| UFC on FX: Belfort vs. Rockhold
| 
| align=center| 3
| align=center| 5:00
| Jaraguá do Sul, Santa Catarina, Brazil
| 
|-
| Loss
| align=center| 14–5
| Dong Hyun Kim
| Decision (unanimous)
| UFC on Fuel TV: Franklin vs. Le
| 
| align=center| 3
| align=center| 5:00
| Macau, SAR, China
| 
|-
| Loss
| align=center| 14–4
| Siyar Bahadurzada
| KO (punch)
| UFC on Fuel TV: Gustafsson vs. Silva
| 
| align=center| 1
| align=center| 0:42
| Stockholm, Sweden
| 
|-
| Win
| align=center| 14–3
| David Mitchell
| Decision (unanimous)
| UFC 134
| 
| align=center| 3
| align=center| 5:00
| Rio de Janeiro, Rio de Janeiro, Brazil
| 
|-
| Loss
| align=center| 13–3
| Diego Sanchez
| Decision (unanimous)
| UFC 121
| 
| align=center| 3
| align=center| 5:00
| Anaheim, California, United States
| 
|-
| Loss
| align=center| 13–2
| Martin Kampmann
| Decision (unanimous)
| UFC 115
| 
| align=center| 3
| align=center| 5:00
| Vancouver, British Columbia, Canada
| 
|-
| Win
| align=center| 13–1
| Mike Swick
| Technical Submission (D'arce choke)
| UFC 109
| 
| align=center| 2
| align=center| 1:54
| Las Vegas, Nevada, United States
| 
|-
| Win
| align=center| 12–1
| Jacob Volkmann
| Decision (unanimous)
| UFC 106
| 
| align=center| 3
| align=center| 5:00
| Las Vegas, Nevada, United States
| 
|-
| Loss
| align=center| 11–1
| Jon Fitch
| Decision (unanimous)
| UFC 100
| 
| align=center| 3
| align=center| 5:00
| Las Vegas, Nevada, United States
| 
|-
| Win
| align=center| 11–0
| Josh Koscheck
| KO (punches)
| UFC 95
| 
| align=center| 1
| align=center| 3:29
| London, England
| 
|-
| Win
| align=center| 10–0
| Luiz Dutra Jr.
| TKO (knee injury)
| Jungle Fight 11
| 
| align=center| 1
| align=center| 0:40
| Rio de Janeiro, Rio de Janeiro, Brazil
| 
|-
| Win
| align=center| 9–0
| Ferrid Kheder
| Decision (unanimous)
| Jungle Fight 10
| 
| align=center| 3
| align=center| 5:00
| Rio de Janeiro, Rio de Janeiro, Brazil
| 
|-
| Win
| align=center| 8–0
| Paulo Cavera
| Submission (arm-triangle choke)
| Jungle Fight 9: Warriors
| 
| align=center| 1
| align=center| N/A
| Rio de Janeiro, Rio de Janeiro, Brazil
| 
|-
| Win
| align=center| 7–0
| Leonardo Pecanha
| Decision (unanimous)
| Jungle Fight 8
| 
| align=center| 3
| align=center| 5:00
| Rio de Janeiro, Rio de Janeiro, Brazil
| 
|-
| Win
| align=center| 6–0
| Fernando Bettega
| Submission (arm-triangle choke)
| Capital Fight 1
| 
| align=center| 1
| align=center| 2:02
| Brasília, Distrito Federal, Brazil
| 
|-
| Win
| align=center| 5–0
| Franklin Careli
| Submission (rear-naked choke)
| Conquista Fight 3
| 
| align=center| 2
| align=center| 0:37
| Rio de Janeiro, Rio de Janeiro, Brazil
| 
|-
| Win
| align=center| 4–0
| Igor Maux
| Submission (anaconda choke)
| rowspan=3|Grand Prix Planaltina
| rowspan=3|
| align=center| 1
| align=center| 1:06
| rowspan=3|Planaltina, Distrito Federal, Brazil
| 
|-
| Win
| align=center| 3–0
| Diogo Almeida
| Submission (guillotine choke)
| align=center| 3
| align=center| 1:21
| 
|-
| Win
| align=center| 2–0
| Marcone Bezerra
| Submission (arm-triangle choke)
| align=center| 3
| align=center| 1:31
| 
|-
| Win
| align=center| 1–0
| Ricardo Petrucio
| Submission (triangle choke)
| Storm Samurai 8
| 
| align=center| 3
| align=center| 1:36
| Rio de Janeiro, Rio de Janeiro, Brazil
|

References

External links
Official UFC Profile

Living people
Brazilian male mixed martial artists
Brazilian practitioners of Brazilian jiu-jitsu
People awarded a black belt in Brazilian jiu-jitsu
Brazilian male judoka
Welterweight mixed martial artists
Mixed martial artists utilizing Brazilian jiu-jitsu
Mixed martial artists utilizing judo
Sportspeople from Brasília
1981 births
Ultimate Fighting Championship male fighters